The New York City Municipal Archives (NYCMA) is a division of the New York City Department of Records and Information Services, located in the Surrogate's Courthouse in Manhattan. Founded in 1950, the Municipal Archives preserves and makes accessible records created by the government of New York City (including the mayor's office, city agencies, the City Council, the Comptroller, borough presidents and the Public Advocate). The collections include manuscripts, sound recordings, film and tape footage, maps, blueprints, photographs and digital media.

Genealogy and family history 
The New York City Municipal Archives preserves and makes available more than 10 million historical vital records (birth, marriage and death certificates) for all five boroughs (Manhattan, Brooklyn, the Bronx, Queens and Staten Island).  Researchers have open access to the indexes, and both microfilmed and digital copies of vital records on-site in the Municipal Library and Archives Reference Room. Copies of vital records can be ordered through the Department of Records and Information Services.

Municipal Archive units 
The Municipal Archives consists of four units to ensure the multi-format collections created by New York City Government are acquired, described, preserved and made publicly accessible. They are:

 Appraisals and Accessions unit works with the Department's Records Management Division to formally acquire city records with historical, cultural or other value.
 Collections Management unit implements the core stewardship standards for maintaining a records depository through industry-standard descriptions and access tools.
 Conservation and Preservation unit ensures environmental and physical actions are taken to anticipate, prevent, reduce or halt the deterioration of library and archival materials. The unit manages a professional paper conservation lab.
 Digital Programs unit manages the digital infrastructure and implements the policies and workflows for digitized and born-digital materials.

Collections 
The archives’ collections consist of more than 200,000 cubic feet and 185 TB of digital records in the Surrogate's Courthouse. Highlights include documents from the first Dutch colonial government in New Amsterdam, the most comprehensive collection of records pertaining to the administration of criminal justice in the English-speaking world, two centuries of mayoral papers, the architectural plans for construction of Central Park and the Brooklyn Bridge, and a nationally recognized collection of public education records.  The online portal offers 1.6 million images including pictures of every house and building in the city dating from 1940 and 1985.

Internal collections 
 Artifacts and Memorial Collections of the World Trade Center Attack on September 11, 2001
Almshouse, 1758-1953
Assessed Valuation of Real Estate, 1789-1979
Board of Education, 1842-2002
Brooklyn Bridge, 1867-1938
Department of Buildings, 1866-1975
Census
City Cemetery, 1881-1950s
City Council, 1647-1977
Civil List, 1883-1967/68
Coroner and Office of Chief Medical Examiner, 1823-1950
Court Records, 1684-1966
District Attorney Records, 1895-1971
Genealogy, 1795-1948
Mayors, 1849-present
New Amsterdam Records, 1647-1862
New York County Court of General Sessions Grand Jury Indictments, 1879-1893
"Old Towns," 1663-1898
Department of Parks, 1850-1960
Website of Mayor Bloomberg, 2002-2013
Website of Mayor Giuliani, 1994-2001
WNYC, 1936-198 1 and WNYC
WPA Federal Writers' Project (NYC Unit), 1936-1943

The Municipal Archives presents several exhibits each year.  Recent exhibits include Feeding the City: The Unpublished WPA manuscript; Unlikely Historians showcasing materials collected by the New York City Police Department while conducting surveillance between 1960 and 1975; and Little Syria, presented in cooperation with the Arab American National Museum.

The Archives has developed various projects to engage non-traditional audiences including participation in Photoville on an annual basis, gathering community stories from residents of City neighborhoods, and sponsoring a five-year celebration of American women winning suffrage.

References

External links 
 New York City Municipal Archives
Additional exhibit information. www.archives.nyc.
 NYMA Online Gallery

Government of New York City
1950 establishments in New York City
Government agencies established in 1950
Archives in the United States
City archives